Luis Sandrini (22 February 1905 – 5 July 1980) was a prolific Argentine comic film actor and film producer. Widely considered one of the most respected and most acclaimed Argentine comedians by the public and critics. He has made over 80 appearances in film between 1933 and 1980.

Early life 
He was born in the neighborhood of Caballito and was the son of Genovese immigrants. His father was a theatrical actor, and Luis began to work in a circus next to his parents, like clown. In the 1930s he entered the theatrical company of Enrique Muiño  and  Elías Isaac Alippi, where he met his first wife, the actress Chela Cordero. Made his debut in the cinema in 1933 acting in the first Argentine sound film Tango (film) (directed by Luis Moglia Barth) in which he worked with a great of the theater of magazines like Pepe Arias and the stars of the tango Libertad Lamarque, Azucena Maizani, and Tita Merello, with the last one he had a romance when they filmed the film Juan Tenorio. He also appeared on the radio, where he made Felipe, who was the prototype of Buenos Aires nice man, creation of Miguel Coronatto Paz, who was so successful that years later was taken to television on Channel 13, where he shared screen with other great comedians as Tato Bores, Alberto Olmedo, Pepe Biondi, José Marrone, Carlos Balá, Dringue Farías, and Juan Carlos Altavista,  among others.

In the theater he made Cuando los duendes cazan perdices, then taken to the movies, and, behind the scenes, was astonished by the beauty of the young actress Malvina Pastorino whom he married. This resounding success made him become the most representative figure of the golden age of Argentine cinema; which then became entrenched in the film that inaugurated the "hotel accommodation series of the sixties", which was Daniel Tinayre's La Cigarra no es un Bicho.

His last appearances were in costumbristas familiar films of Enrique Carreras. He died when he filmed the movie, My Family's Beautiful!, by Palito Ortega, where he worked alongside another great of the show, Niní Marshall.

Luis Sandrini in popular culture

Luis Sandrini knew to conquer the heart not only of the people of his country but also the rest of the Hispanic world due to the great characterizations of his personages, by which the films in which this great comedian act are known by all like the films of Sandrini, standing out from the rest of the cast and even overshadowing the directors of the films. Even famous expressions of his characters have passed into history, like that well-known of his film "Cuando los duendes cazan perdices": "¡La vieja ve los colores!" (Literally: "The old lady sees the colors!").

He was highly praised for his characterizations and his characters have given people talk even many years after the first releases of his films. The TV program  Peter Capusotto y sus videos features a character played by Diego Capusotto called Bombita Rodríguez, who is believed to be inspired by Professor Tirabombas or Professor Hippie, both of Sandrini.

Peruvian writer Mario Vargas Llosa, Nobel Prize for Literature in 2010, recalls Sandrini in a passage in his novel Who Killed Palomino Molero?: "Lituma and the lieutenant had been at the movies, watching an Argentine film by Luis Sandrini, which made people laugh a lot, but not at them." Mexican comedian Roberto Gómez Bolaños, Chespirito, in his memoirs, says about Sandrini:Among the prizes and recognitions that he obtained they count the Argentine Academy of Cinematography Arts and Sciences Award to the best actor in 1950 por The Fault the Other One Had, and a special mention in 1949 "for his brilliant performance in the Argentine cinema", the Silver Condor Award for Best Comedian in 1950 for Don Juan Tenorio and Juan Globo, the Silver Condor for Best Actor in 1954 for La Casa Grande and in 1972 for La Valija, and the 1981 Honour Konex Award, the latter posthumously.

Filmography

My Family's Beautiful! (1980)
Frutilla (1980)
Diablo metió la pata (1980)
Vivir con alegría (1979)
Casamiento de Laucha, El (1977)
Such is Live (1977)
Canto cuenta su historia, El (1976)
Chicos crecen, Los (1976)
Yo tengo fe (1974)
Hoy le toca a mi mujer (1973)
Professor Tirabombas, El (1972)
Mi amigo Luis (1972)
 La Valija (1971)
Pájaro loco (1971)
Professor patagónico, El (1970)
Un Elefante color ilusión (1970)
Pimienta y pimentón (1970)
El Profesor hippie (1969) .... Professor Héctor 'Tito' Montesano
Kuma Ching (1969)
En mi casa mando yo (1968) .... Esteban Rossi
Cuando los hombres hablan de mujeres (1967) .... Alejandro
¡Al diablo con este cura! (1967) .... Padre Francisco Lambertini
Pimienta (1966) .... Peregrino Ferrari
Bicho raro (1965)
Viaje de una noche de verano (1965)
Mujeres los prefieren tontos, Las (1964)
Cigarra no es un bicho, La (1964) .... Taxi Driver
Castillo de los monstruos, El (1964) .... El Profesor
Y el cuerpo sigue aguantando (1961)
Chafalonías (1960)
"Felipe" (1960) TV Series .... Felipe
Mi esqueleto (1959)
Hombre que hizo el milagro, El (1958)
Fantoche (1957)
Hombre virgen, El (1956)
Barro humano, El (1955) .... Taxista
Cuando los duendes cazan perdices (1955)
Maldición gitana (1953)
The Seducer of Granada (1953)
Casa grande, La (1953)
Payaso (1952)
Me casé con una estrella (1951)
Culpa la tuvo el otro, La (1950) .... Víctor Valdez/Sincerato Cuesta/Víctor Valdez's Mother
Seductor, El (1950)
Baño de Afrodita, El (1949)
Embajador, El (1949) .... Palmiro Sosa
Juan Globo (1949)
Don Juan Tenorio (1949)
¡Olé torero! (1948) .... Manuel
Yo soy tu padre (1948)
The Thief (1947) .... Plácido López
The Private Life of Mark Antony and Cleopatra (1947) .... Marco Antonio
Diablo andaba en los choclos, El (1946)
The Maharaja's Diamond (1946)
The Dance of Fortune (1944)
Dos rivales, Los (1944)
Captain Poison (1943) .... Jorge de Córdoba
Suerte llama tres veces, La (1943)
Amor último modelo (1942)
The House of the Millions (1942)
Sensational Kidnapping (1942)
Peluquería de señoras (1941)
Más infeliz del pueblo, El (1941)
Chingolo (1940)
Bebé de contrabando, Un (1940)
Palabra de honor (1939)
Bartolo tenía una flauta (1939)
Canillita y la dama, El (1938)
Casa de Quirós, La (1937)
Cañonero de Giles, El (1937)
Melodías porteñas (1937)
¡Segundos afuera! (1937)
Loco lindo (1936) .... Miguelito Andrade
Don Quijote del altillo (1936) .... Eusebio
Muchachada de a bordo, La (1936)
Riachuelo (1934)
Hijo de papá, El (1934)
Los tres berretines (1933)
¡Tango! (1933) .... Berretín

References

External links
 

1905 births
Argentine male film actors
Argentine film producers
Male actors from Buenos Aires
Argentine people of Italian descent
1980 deaths
Burials at La Chacarita Cemetery
20th-century Argentine male actors